The Deodhar Trophy, also known as Mastercard Devdhar trophy due to sponsorship reasons (also spelled Devdhar Trophy), is a List A cricket domestic cricket tournament of India. It is named after D. B. Deodhar (known as the Grand Old Man of Indian cricket) and is a  50-over knockout competition played on an annual basis among the 3 national level teams - India A, India B and India C. India B are the current champions, winning the 2019-20 after defeating India C by 51 runs in the final.

History and format 

The competition was introduced in 1973-74 season as an inter-zonal tournament. From 1973–74 to 2014–15, two zonal teams played in a quarter-final, with the winner joining the other three zonal teams in the semi-finals. From there, it was a simple knockout tournament. From 2015–16 to 2017-18, the winners of the Vijay Hazare Trophy, India A and India B play each other in a round-robin format. The top two teams progress to the finals.

From 2018–19, India A, India B and India C play each other in a round-robin format. The top two teams progress to the finals.

Past winners

See also
Cricket in India
Vijay Hazare Trophy
Duleep Trophy
Ranji Trophy
NKP Salve Challenger Trophy
BCCI

References

 
Indian domestic cricket competitions
List A cricket competitions